Teleperformance Philippines (TP) is an offshore business process outsourcing and contact center company in the Philippines. It is a subsidiary of the Teleperformance Group.

Company profile
Teleperformance began operations in the Philippines in 1996 and has grown to become a preferred offshore business solutions option. The company employs around 45,000 people in the country and operates over 35,000 workstations in 22 business sites located across Metro Manila, Antipolo, Cavite, Baguio, Bacolod, Cebu, Cagayan de Oro, and Davao.

Company milestones
Teleperformance was established in the Philippines on April 24, 1996, with its first office located in Taguig, Metro Manila.

In 2002, the company opened its headquarters in Ortigas Center, Pasig.

In 2006, Teleperformance opened its Bacolod site, its first site in the Visayas region.

In 2007, Teleperformance launched its largest contact center in Mandaluyong, which later became its official headquarters.

In 2009, the company opened its site at the SM Mall of Asia in Pasay.

From 2008 to 2010, Teleperformance aggressively grew, adding two more sites in Sucat, Parañaque and in Fairview, Quezon City.

In 2011, Teleperformance further expanded with the opening of its sites in Makati and at the Cebu Business Park, its first site in Cebu.

In 2013, Teleperformance further expanded with two sites added, one at SM Antipolo and another at SM City Davao.

In July 2014, Teleperformance announced its acquisition of Aegis’ operations in the Philippines, United States and Puerto Rico from Essar Global Fund's AGC Holdings for $610 million.

In 2015, Teleperformance opened two more sites at SM Aura in Taguig City and at Fairview Terraces in Quezon City.

In 2016, Teleperformance launched its sites in Silver City, Pasig and Cagayan de Oro.

In 2018, Teleperformance launched its 19th site in Vertis North, Quezon City.

Also in 2018, along with its acquisition of Intelenet Global Services and e-Konflux Solutions Inc., Teleperformance launched two new sites in McKinley West, Taguig and Paseo de Roxas, Makati.

In 2020, Teleperformance launched its 22nd site in the Philippines, located in Molino, Bacoor, Cavite.

References

Business process outsourcing companies of the Philippines
Companies based in Mandaluyong
Philippine companies established in 1996
Business services companies established in 1996
Philippine subsidiaries of foreign companies